Pterolophia ugandae is a species of beetle in the family Cerambycidae. It was described by Stephan von Breuning in 1938. It is known from Uganda and Angola. It contains the subspecies Pterolophia ugandae ugandae.

References

ugandae
Beetles described in 1938